Girls' Latin School of Baltimore was a college preparatory school in Baltimore, Maryland, in existence from 1890 to 1951. The school was founded in 1890 as an extension of Goucher College, at the time located on the campus. It separated from Goucher in 1909, and relocated in 1914 and again 1927.

References

Preparatory schools in Maryland
1890 establishments in Maryland
Private schools in Baltimore
Educational institutions established in 1890
1951 disestablishments in Maryland
Educational institutions disestablished in 1951
Defunct schools in Maryland